How Institutions Think (first published 1986) is a book that contains the published version of the Frank W. Abrams Lectures delivered by the influential cultural anthropologist Mary Douglas at Syracuse University in March 1985.

Summary 
In How Institutions Think, Douglas offers a critique of the rational choice theory rooted in social anthropology and a structural functionalist approach. She aims at explaining how humans cooperate, and the role of building and maintaining institutions to shape ways of thinking useful to cooperation. To achieve this, she builds on the work of Émile Durkheim and Ludwig Fleck and examples drawn from anthropology.

She argues that rational choice theory that humans cooperate because this is individually advantageous can not explain empirically observed phenomena, such as self-sacrifice or non-authoritarian, 'latent', groups. The book aims at discussing alternative explanations, such as the building of analogies to support common understandings from early human communities.

Influence 
In 2019, Marc Ventresca argued this is Douglas' best-known book.

Reviews
Ian Hacking in the London Review of Books, 8/22, 18 December 1986.
Kenneth Lipartito in the Business History Review, 80/1, Spring 2006, pp. 135–140.

References 

1986 books
Books by Mary Douglas
Anthropology books
Syracuse University Press books